Michel-Ange Nzojibwami is a Burundian actor and director. He is best known internationally for his performance as Colonel Théoneste Bagosora in the film Shake Hands With the Devil, for which he garnered a Genie Award nomination for Best Supporting Actor at the 28th Genie Awards in 2008.

He has served as director of Tubiyage, a Burundian theatre company, and as vice-president of the Burundian film industry organization COPRODAC.

Filmography

References

External links

Burundian male film actors
Living people
Year of birth missing (living people)
21st-century male actors